Puya compacta is a species of puya in the family Bromeliaceae. It is endemic to Ecuador.

Its natural habitat is subtropical or tropical high-altitude grassland. It is a critically endangered species, threatened by habitat loss.

References

compacta
Endemic flora of Ecuador
Critically endangered plants
Taxonomy articles created by Polbot